Reganella depressa is the only species of the monotypic genus Reganella, a genus of the family Loricariidae of catfish (order Siluriformes). R.depressa is a poorly known species and uncommon in collections. Its phylogenetic position remains uncertain.

This species is endemic to Brazil where it occurs in the middle Amazon basin, including the Negro, Tapajos, and Branco Rivers. R. depressa probably inhabits sandy substrates with flowing waters. R. depressa reaches a length of  SL.

References

Loricariini
Fish described in 1853
Fish of South America
Fish of Brazil
Fish of the Amazon basin
Endemic fauna of Brazil
Monotypic freshwater fish genera
Catfish genera
Taxa named by Carl H. Eigenmann
Taxa named by Rudolf Kner